The 2009 European Junior Judo Championships is an edition of the European Junior Judo Championships, organised by the European Judo Union.It was held in Yerevan, Armenia from 11 to 13 September 2009.

Medal summary

Medal table

Men's events

Women's events

Source Results

References

External links
 

 U21
European Junior Judo Championships
European Championships, U21
Judo
Judo
Judo, World Championships U21